MSJ may refer to:

 Microsoft Systems Journal, a former technical journal by Microsoft Corporation, merged into MSDN Magazine
 Mission San Jose High School, a high school in Fremont, California, United States
 Motion for Summary judgment, a legal term requesting a judgment without a full trial
 Mount Saint Joseph (disambiguation), several places and schools
 Misawa Airport (IATA airport code MSJ), Misawa, Aomori, Japan
 Ma language (ISO 639 language code msj)
 Master of Science in Journalism

See also

 
 The International MS Journal
 Microsoft Japan